The 2000–01 season saw St Mirren compete in the Scottish Premier League where they finished in 12th position with 30 points, suffering relegation.

Final league table

Results
St Mirren's score comes first

Legend

Scottish Premier League

Scottish Cup

Scottish League Cup

References

External links
 St Mirren 2000–01 at Soccerbase.com (select relevant season from dropdown list)

St Mirren F.C. seasons
St Mirren